The women's tournament at the 2017 World Team Ninepin Bowling Classic Championships was held in Dettenheim, Germany from 20 to 27 May 2017.

The host Germany captured their sixth title by defeating Croatia in the final match after the first ever sudden victory (45-39). Bronze medals was secured by Czechia and Slovenia.

Participating teams

Draw

Groups

Group stage

Group A 

|}

Group B 

|}

Group C 

|}

Group D 

|}

Final Round

Bracket

Quarterfinals

Semifinals

Final

Final standing 

Team Roster
Gabby Stone, Maddie Musselman, Melissa Seidemann, Rachel Fattal, Paige Hauschild, Maggie Steffens (C), Jordan Raney, Kiley Neushul, Aria Fischer, Jamie Neushul, Makenzie Fischer, Alys Williams, Amanda Longan. Head coach: Adam Krikorian.

Footnotes

References 

2017
2017 World Team Ninepin Bowling Classic Championships